= Alliance for Global Water Adaptation =

International non-governmental organization

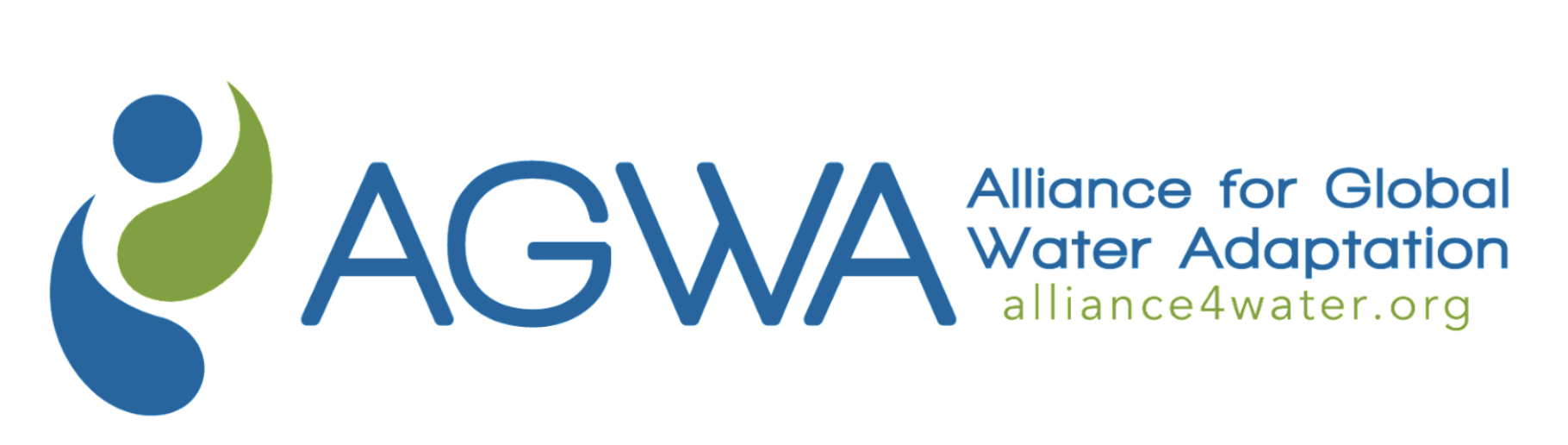
The Alliance for Global Water Adaptation (AGWA)

The Alliance for Global Water Adaptation (AGWA) is an international membership-based non-governmental organization (NGO) and network that promotes climate resilience in water resources management.

AGWA collaborates with experts, policymakers, and institutions to foster collaboration and develop solutions for the sustainable management of water resources in the context of climate change. AGWA works through its member network to crowd-source cross-disciplinary solutions spanning institutions and sectors. By engaging directly with members, AGWA enables hundreds of institutions and thousands of individuals globally to align their visions and co-develop integrated tools that combine technical knowledge, financial mechanisms, and policy processes to advance resilience. AGWA works across technical and policy initiatives to mainstream resilient water resources management, with an emphasis on the links between water resources and climate adaptation and mitigation.

== History ==
AGWA was co-founded in 2010 by John Matthews and Diego Rodriguez of The World Bank as a response to concerns about the vulnerability of water systems to climate change. Its initial aim was to connect practitioners, researchers, and policymakers working on climate adaptation in water management. Since then, AGWA has grown into a global network involving governments, international organizations, development banks, NGOs, and academic institutions.

== Guiding Values ==
Members of AGWA share a set of principles, including:

- Policies, governance, and actions involving water and climate should be both robust and adaptable to climate uncertainty.
- Sustainable water resources management is essential for sustainable development, climate planning, and risk management.
- The resilience and sustainability of ecosystems are fundamental to effective water resources management.
- Adaptation and mitigation efforts should contribute to both socio-economic development and environmental preservation.

== Programs and Initiatives ==
=== Technical Tools and Frameworks ===
Climate Risk Informed Decision Analysis (CRIDA): Developed with UNESCO’s International Hydrological Programme, CRIDA provides a structured framework for incorporating climate uncertainty into water management. It has been applied globally to guide resilient infrastructure planning.

Water Resilience Assessment Framework (WRAF): Developed with partners including the CEO Water Mandate, WRAF provides a methodology for assessing and integrating resilience principles into planning and investment decisions.

Water Resilience for Economic Resilience (WR4ER): This initiative focuses on the nexus of water security and macroeconomic stability. It seeks to demonstrate how resilient water systems underpin energy, agriculture, and industrial sectors, making a financial case for water-centric climate investment.

- In 2023, AGWA released the report "Managing Water for Economic Resilience: De-Risking Is Not Enough," which provides recommendations for macroeconomists, central bankers, and finance ministries. The program explores the intersection of credit ratings, insurance, and water-based adaptation to catalyze "structural transformation" in how economies value water.

=== National and Global Climate Policy ===
Water Resilience Tracker (WRT): A tool designed to help governments evaluate and strengthen water resilience in their Nationally Determined Contributions (NDCs) and National Adaptation Plans (NAPs). It assists governments in identifying where water is mentioned or absent in their Nationally Determined Contributions (NDCs) and National Adaptation Plans (NAPs). As of 2024, the Tracker has been deployed in over 15 countries across Africa, Asia, and Latin America. It has been promoted in Africa and the Global South as part of the Just Transitions for Water Security consortium.

Watering the NDCs: A guidance document developed with partners in over 100 countries to integrate water into national climate planning under the Paris Agreement, the 2030 Agenda, and the Sendai Framework.

Nature-based Solutions (NbS) for Resilience: AGWA supports the development of NbS approaches for water and climate adaptation.
